Thomas Francis Eagleton (September 4, 1929 – March 4, 2007) was an American lawyer serving as a United States senator from Missouri, from 1968 to 1987. He was briefly the Democratic vice presidential nominee under George McGovern in 1972. He suffered from bouts of depression throughout his life, resulting in several hospitalizations, which were kept secret from the public. When they were revealed, it humiliated the McGovern campaign and Eagleton was forced to quit the race. He later became adjunct professor of public affairs at Washington University in St. Louis.

Early life and political career

Eagleton was born in St. Louis, Missouri, the son of Zitta Louise (Swanson) and Mark David Eagleton, a politician who had run for mayor. His paternal grandparents were Irish immigrants, and his mother had Swedish, Irish, French, and Austrian ancestry.

He graduated from St. Louis Country Day School, served in the U.S. Navy for two years, and graduated from Amherst College in 1950, where he was a member of Delta Kappa Epsilon fraternity (Sigma Chapter). He then attended Harvard Law School. Following his graduation in 1953, Eagleton practiced law at his father's firm and later became associated with Anheuser-Busch's legal department.

Eagleton married Barbara Ann Smith of St. Louis on January 26, 1956. A son, Terence, was born in 1959, and a daughter, Christin, was born in 1963.

He was elected circuit attorney of the City of St. Louis in 1956.  During his tenure, he appeared on the TV show What's My Line? (episode #355) as "District Attorney of St. Louis". (He stumped the panel.)  He was elected Missouri Attorney General in 1960, at the age of 31 (the youngest in the state's history). He was elected the 38th Lieutenant Governor of Missouri in 1964, and won a U.S. Senate seat in 1968, unseating incumbent Edward V. Long in the Democratic primary and narrowly defeating Congressman Thomas B. Curtis in the general election.

Eagleton suffered from depression; he checked himself into hospital three times between 1960 and 1966 for physical and nervous exhaustion, receiving electroconvulsive therapy (shock therapy) twice. He later received a diagnosis of bipolar II from Dr. Frederick K. Goodwin.

The hospitalizations, which were not widely publicized, had little effect on his political aspirations, although the St. Louis Post-Dispatch was to note, in 1972, immediately after his vice presidential nomination: "He had been troubled with gastric disturbances, which led to occasional hospitalizations. The stomach troubles have contributed to rumors that he had a drinking problem."

1972 presidential campaign

"Amnesty, abortion, and acid"
On April 25, 1972, as George McGovern won the Massachusetts Democratic primary, conservative journalist Robert Novak phoned Democratic politicians around the country. On April 27, 1972, Novak reported in a column his conversation with an unnamed Democratic senator about McGovern.

Novak quoted the senator as saying "The people don't know McGovern is for amnesty, abortion, and legalization of pot.  Once middle America—Catholic middle America, in particular—finds this out, he's dead." Because of the column McGovern became known as the candidate of "amnesty, abortion, and acid," even though he only supported the decriminalization of marijuana and maintained that legalized abortion fell under the purview of states' rights.

On July 15, 2007, several months after Eagleton's death, Novak said on Meet the Press that the unnamed senator was Eagleton. Novak was accused in 1972 of manufacturing the quote, but stated that to rebut the criticism, he took Eagleton to lunch after the campaign and asked whether he could identify him as the source; the senator refused. "Oh, he had to run for re-election," said Novak, "the McGovernites would kill him if they knew he had said that." Political analyst Bob Shrum says that Eagleton would never have been selected as McGovern's running mate if it had been known at the time that Eagleton was the source of the quote. "Boy, do I wish he would have let you publish his name.  Then he never would have been picked as vice president," said Shrum. "Because the two things, the two things that happened to George McGovern—two of the things that happened to him—were the label you put on him, number one, and number two, the Eagleton disaster.  We had a messy convention, but he could have, I think in the end, carried eight or 10 states, remained politically viable.  And Eagleton was one of the great train wrecks of all time."

Selection as vice-presidential nominee

After a large number of prominent Democrats declined to be McGovern's running mate, Senator Gaylord Nelson (who was among those who declined) suggested Eagleton. McGovern chose Eagleton after only a minimal background check, as had been customary for vice presidential selections at that time. Eagleton made no mention of his earlier hospitalizations, and in fact decided with his wife to keep them secret from McGovern while he was flying to his first meeting with McGovern.

Replacement on the ticket
On July 25, 1972, just over two weeks after the 1972 Democratic Convention, Eagleton admitted the truth of news reports that he had received electroshock therapy for clinical depression during the 1960s. McGovern initially said he would back Eagleton "1000 percent".  Subsequently, McGovern consulted confidentially with preeminent psychiatrists, including Eagleton's own doctors, who advised him that a recurrence of Eagleton's depression was possible and could endanger the country should Eagleton become acting president.  On August 1, nineteen days after being nominated, Eagleton withdrew at McGovern's request and, after a new search by McGovern, Thomas Eagleton was replaced by Sargent Shriver, former U.S. Ambassador to France, and former (founding) Director of the Peace Corps and the Office of Economic Opportunity.

A Time poll taken at the time found that 77 percent of the respondents said "Eagleton's medical record would not affect their vote." Nonetheless, the press made frequent references to his "shock therapy", and McGovern feared that this would detract from his campaign platform.

McGovern's failure to thoroughly vet Eagleton and his subsequent handling of the controversy gave occasion for the Republican campaign to raise serious questions about his judgment. In the general election, the Democratic ticket won only Massachusetts and the District of Columbia.

Re-election to Senate

Missouri returned Eagleton to the Senate in 1974; he won 60% of the popular vote against Thomas B. Curtis, who had been his opponent in 1968.  In 1980, he was re-elected by a closer-than-expected margin over St. Louis County Executive Gene McNary.

During the 1980 election, Eagleton's niece Elizabeth Eagleton Weigand and lawyer Stephen Poludniak were arrested for blackmail after they threatened to spread false accusations that Eagleton was bisexual. Eagleton told reporters that the extorted money was to be turned over to the Church of Scientology. Poludniak and Weigand appealed the conviction all the way to the U.S. Supreme Court, arguing that they could not have gotten a fair trial because of "the massive publicity surrounding this case, coupled with the pre-existing sentiment in favor of Sen. Eagleton". The Court turned down the appeal.

Eagleton did not seek a fourth term in 1986. Former Republican Governor Kit Bond succeeded him in the Senate. The seat remained in Republican hands following Bond's retirement when Roy Blunt was elected in 2010 and 2016 and Eric Schmitt in 2022.

Senate career
In the Senate, Eagleton was active in matters dealing with foreign relations, intelligence, defense, education, health care, and the environment. He was instrumental to the Senate's passage of the Clean Air Act and the Clean Water Act, and sponsored the amendment that halted the bombing in Cambodia and effectively ended American involvement in the Vietnam War.

Notably, Eagleton was one of only three senators to oppose the nomination of Gerald Ford as Vice President in 1973. The other two senators voting no were William Hathaway of Maine, and Gaylord Nelson of Wisconsin.  

Eagleton was one of the authors of The Hatch-Eagleton Amendment, introduced in the Senate on January 26, 1983 with Sen. Orrin Hatch (R), which stated that "A right to abortion is not secured by this Constitution."

Post-Senate career
In January 1987, Eagleton returned to Missouri as an attorney, political commentator, and professor at Washington University in St. Louis, where until his death he was professor of public affairs. Throughout his Washington University career, Eagleton taught courses in economics with former chairman of the Council of Economic Advisors Murray Weidenbaum and with history professor Henry W. Berger on the Vietnam War.

On July 23, 1996, Eagleton delivered a warm introductory speech for McGovern during a promotional tour for McGovern's book, Terry: My Daughter's Life-and-Death Struggle with Alcoholism, at The Library, Ltd., in St. Louis, Missouri. At that time, McGovern spoke favorably about Eagleton and reminisced about their short-lived presidential ticket in 1972.

During the 2000s, Eagleton served on the Council of Elders for the George and Eleanor McGovern Center for Leadership and Public Service at Dakota Wesleyan University.

In January 2001, he joined other Missouri Democrats to oppose the nomination of former governor and senator John Ashcroft for United States Attorney General. Eagleton was quoted in the official Judiciary Committee record: "John Danforth would have been my first choice. John Ashcroft would have been my last choice."

In 2005 and 2006, he co-taught a seminar on the US presidency and the Constitution with Joel Goldstein at Saint Louis University School of Law. He was also a partner in the St. Louis law firm Thompson Coburn and was a chief negotiator for a coalition of local business interests that lured the Los Angeles Rams football team to St. Louis. Eagleton authored three books on politics. Eagleton also strongly supported Democratic Senate candidate Claire McCaskill in 2006; McCaskill won, defeating incumbent Jim Talent.

Eagleton led a group, Catholics for Amendment 2, composed of prominent Catholics that challenged church leaders' opposition to embryonic stem cell research and to a proposed state constitutional amendment that would have protected such research in Missouri. The group e-mailed a letter to fellow Catholics explaining reasons for supporting Amendment 2. The amendment ensures that any federally approved stem cell research and treatments would be available in Missouri. "[T]he letter from Catholics for Amendment 2 said the group felt a moral obligation to respond to what it called misinformation, scare tactics and distortions being spread by opponents of the initiative, including the church."

Eagleton died in St. Louis on March 4, 2007, of heart and respiratory complications. Eagleton donated his body to medical science at Washington University. He wrote a farewell letter to his family and friends months before he died, citing that his dying wishes were for people to "go forth in love and peace—be kind to dogs—and vote Democratic".

Honors and awards
Eagleton threw out the ceremonial first pitch to end the pregame ceremonies of Game 5 of the 1985 World Series.

The 8th Circuit federal courthouse in St. Louis is named after Eagleton.  Dedicated on September 11, 2000, it is named the Thomas F. Eagleton United States Courthose.

Eagleton has been honored with a star on the St. Louis Walk of Fame.

See also

References

Further reading
 Bormann, Ernest G. "The Eagleton affair: A fantasy theme analysis". Quarterly Journal of Speech 59.2 (1973): 143–159.
 Dickerson, John. "One of the Great Train Wrecks of All Time". Slate online magazine podcast 6/10/15
 Giglio, James N. Call Me Tom: The Life of Thomas F. Eagleton (University of Missouri Press; 2011) 328 pages
 Giglio, James N. "The Eagleton Affair: Thomas Eagleton, George McGovern, and the 1972 Vice Presidential Nomination", Presidential Studies Quarterly, (2009) 39#4 pp. 647–676
 Glasser, Joshua M. Eighteen-Day Running Mate: McGovern, Eagleton, and a Campaign in Crisis  (Yale University Press, 2012). Comprehensive scholarly history
 Hendrickson, Paul.  "George McGovern & the Coldest Plunge", The Washington Post, September 28, 1983
 Strout, Lawrence N. "Politics and mental illness: The campaigns of Thomas Eagleton and Lawton Chiles". Journal of American Culture 18.3 (1995): 67–73. .
 Trent, Judith S., and Jimmie D. Trent. "The rhetoric of the challenger: George Stanley McGovern". Communication Studies 25#1 (1974): 11–18. .
 White, Theodore. The Making of the President, 1972 (1973)
 Time magazine—July 24, 1972 cover article
 Time magazine—August 7, 1972 cover on withdrawal
 "McGovern's First Crisis: The Eagleton Affair" Time  August 7, 1972, cover story
 "George McGovern Finally Finds a Veep" Time  August 14, 1972, cover story

External links

 
 

|-

|-

|-

|-

|-

1929 births
1972 United States vice-presidential candidates
2007 deaths
20th-century American politicians
American legal scholars
American people of Austrian descent
American people of French descent
American people of Irish descent
American people of Swedish descent
Amherst College alumni
Candidates in the 1984 United States presidential election
Catholics from Missouri
Dakota Wesleyan University people
Democratic Party (United States) vice presidential nominees
Democratic Party United States senators from Missouri
Harvard Law School alumni
Lieutenant Governors of Missouri
Missouri Attorneys General
Missouri Democrats
Politicians from St. Louis County, Missouri
People with bipolar disorder
Politicians from St. Louis
Saint Louis University School of Law faculty
United States Navy officers
Washington University in St. Louis faculty